CD-38 2551, also known as WASP-63, is a single star with an exoplanetary companion in the southern constellation of Columba. It is too faint to be visible with the naked eye, having an apparent visual magnitude of 11.1. The distance to this system is approximately 956 light-years based on parallax measurements, but it is drifting closer with a radial velocity of −24 km/s.

Stellar properties
This is a G-type star with a stellar classification of G8; the luminosity class is currently unknown. The star is much older than the Sun at approximately 8.3 billion years.  WASP-63 is slightly enriched in heavy elements, having 120% of the solar abundance of iron. The stellar radius is enlarged for a G8 star, and models suggest it has evolved into a subgiant star. It has 1.1 times the mass of the Sun and is spinning with a projected rotational velocity of 3 km/s.

Planetary system
In 2012 a transiting gas giant planet b was detected on a tight, circular orbit. The planet is similar to Saturn in mass but is highly inflated due to proximity to the parent star. The planetary atmosphere contains water and likely has a high cloud deck of indeterminate composition.

In August 2022, this planetary system was included among 20 systems to be named by the third NameExoWorlds project.

References

G-type subgiants
Planetary systems with one confirmed planet
Planetary transit variables
Columba (constellation)
J06172074-3819237
Durchmusterung objects